The Boston Natural Areas Network  (BNAN), founded in 1977 is a non-profit organization based in Boston, in the U.S. state of Massachusetts, which works to identify and protect significant natural areas described as urban wilds and greenways in the metropolitan area.

Mission
The Boston Natural Areas Network works to preserve, expand and improve urban open space through community organizing, acquisition, ownership, programming, development and management of special kinds of urban land–urban wilds, greenways and community gardens. In all of its endeavors,  BNAN is guided by local citizens advocating for their open spaces and assisting them to preserve and shape their communities.

History
Originally named the Boston Natural Areas Fund, the organization was founded by a small group of citizens in response to a Boston Redevelopment Authority report titled Boston Urban Wilds. The report cited nearly 150 unprotected sites of natural beauty, undeveloped areas and under-developed areas, including community gardens, each of environmental significance, all of which faced encroachment form a rapid expansion in development taking place. Within five years, the organization, working with local neighborhood groups, had begun acquiring properties and setting in place protection from future development.

After 7 years of being an affiliate of The Trustees of Reservations, in December 2014 BNAN officially merged with the Trustees, and became part of the Trustees Boston Region.

See also
Emerald Necklace
South End Lower Roxbury Open Space Land Trust
The Trustees of Reservations

External links
The Boston Natural Areas Network website

Community gardening in Massachusetts
Urban agriculture
Community building
Environmental organizations based in Massachusetts
Non-profit organizations based in Boston
1977 establishments in Massachusetts